The 2010 Universal Forum of Cultures was an international event that took place in Valparaíso, Chile in 2010. It was the third edition of the Universal Forum of Cultures.

History 
The forum was held in Valparaíso, Chile in 2010.

References

History of Valparaíso Region
2010 in Chile